The 2021 Japanese Super Formula Championship was the forty-ninth season of premier Japanese open-wheel motor racing, and the ninth under the moniker of Super Formula. Naoki Yamamoto entered the 2021 season as the defending drivers' champion.

Tomoki Nojiri took his first drivers' championship at the penultimate round at Motegi, while Team Impul took their first teams' championship since 2010 at the season finale.

Teams and drivers 

 Yves Baltas was scheduled to compete for B-Max Racing, but did not enter any rounds.

Driver changes 

 Three-time and defending series champion Naoki Yamamoto moved to TCS Nakajima Racing after spending two seasons with Dandelion Racing. This was Yamamoto's first time driving for Nakajima Racing since his rookie season in 2010.
 Tadasuke Makino moved to DoCoMo Team Dandelion Racing after two seasons with Nakajima Racing.
 Reigning Super Formula Lights champion Ritomo Miyata drove full-time for Vantelin Team TOM's, after running two races in 2020 in relief of Kazuki Nakajima.
 Reigning Formula Regional Japanese Champion Sena Sakaguchi drove full-time for P.mu/Cerumo-INGING, after appearing in the 2020 Okayama round in relief of Kenta Yamashita.
 Two-time series champion Hiroaki Ishiura has retired from the series.
 2019 series champion Nick Cassidy has exited the series, following his move to the FIA Formula E World Championship with Envision Virgin Racing.

In-season changes 

Illness:
 Tadasuke Makino: missed the first two rounds of the season due to a bout with meningitis. Ukyo Sasahara was his replacement.

Visa issues:
 Sacha Fenestraz: missed the first five rounds because of visa issues. Yuichi Nakayama was his replacement.

International protocols: 
Drivers who participated in 2021 FIA World Endurance Championship races or testing sessions missed rounds because of Japanese 14-day quarantine rules.  Date clashes were with the 6 Hours of Spa-Francorchamps on 1 May, which clashed with Suzuka (25 April) and Autopolis (16 May), the 8 Hours of Portimão, which clashed with Sugo (19 June), and the 8 Hours of Bahrain, which clashes with the Suzuka date on 31 October.

 Kamui Kobayashi: missed all but the sixth round at Motegi due to commitments in the WEC and IMSA. Kazuto Kotaka was his replacement.
 Kazuki Nakajima: missed both Suzuka rounds, Autopolis, Sugo, and the fifth round at Motegi. Giuliano Alesi was his replacement, and won a rain shortened race from pole position at Autopolis.
 Tatiana Calderon: missed Autopolis, Sugo, and the fifth round at Motegi (was able to participate in the April Suzuka round because of local regulations with her licence, which is from the ACC, the Colombian ASN of the FIA, unlike the Japanese drivers, who have JAF licences). Koudai Tsukakoshi was her replacement.
 Ryo Hirakawa: missed Sugo. Mitsunori Takaboshi was his replacement.

Other 

 Nobuharu Matsushita: joined B-Max Racing from the second round at Suzuka. He was initially denied an engine lease from Honda, after signing a factory racing contract with Nissan in the Super GT Series. This prevented him from racing in the opening round at Fuji. Honda would reverse their decision after Masaya Nagai replaced Hiroshi Shimizu as the Director of Motorsport at Honda.

Race calendar 
The provisional calendar was announced on 6 August 2020. After heavy disruptions to the 2020 season due to the COVID-19 pandemic, the series returned to a more traditional schedule, with Suzuka Circuit hosting the season finale as it was usual. On 12 April 2021, the organisation announced the cancellation of the Okayama round, which was due to be held in the first week of October. Instead, a second round at Motegi was confirmed.

Results

Season summary

Championship standings 

 Race points

 Qualifying points

Drivers' Championship

Overall

Teams' championship

Notes

References

External links
Japanese Championship Super Formula official website 

2021
Super Formula
Super Formula